Melissa Boloña (born December 28, 1989) is an American actress and model. She starred in the films Acts of Violence, The Hurricane Heist, Malicious, and Dog Eat Dog.

Early life and education

Boloña was born in Connecticut, and grew up in New Jersey and Lima, Peru. Boloña went into acting at the age of twelve. Her mother took her to acting classes when she was young, but she took a hiatus in order to focus on her education. Boloña began taking acting more seriously while studying international marketing in Paris, enrolling in acting classes which she continued while studying for her degree. Upon graduation, she began pursuing acting as a profession.

Career

Boloña's acting debut was in the movies of the week Grace of God and The Saint. In the summer of 2015 she had her feature film debut as the supporting female lead in the theatrical release of In Stereo. She has continued her acting career regularly appearing in films since, most recently as Lisa in The Final Wish.

Boloña has modeled for numerous magazines. She became a model for Beach Bunny Swimwear in 2013 after beating out 20,000 others in a model search. She appeared in campaigns for the brand which were shot alongside Irina Shayk. She has appeared on numerous magazine covers, most recently for Vanidades.

Filmography

Film

Television

Philanthropy
Bolona was recognized by The New York Observer as a leading young philanthropist in 2015.

References

External links
 

American actresses
American people of Peruvian descent
Living people
Female models from Connecticut
People from Greenwich, Connecticut
1989 births